Graham Preston Bruce is a former Canadian politician. After serving as Mayor of North Cowichan, Bruce was elected as a Social Credit Member of the Legislative Assembly of British Columbia from 1986 to 1991 in the electoral district of Cowichan-Malahat. He was later re-elected as a BC Liberal, representing the district of Cowichan-Ladysmith from 2001 to 2005.

On October 3, 1989, Bruce and three colleagues — Duane Delton Crandall, David Mercier, and Doug Mowat — quit the governing Social Credit caucus to sit as "Independent Social Credit" members. In a joint statement, the four stressed that they "in no way desire[d] the fall of our government", but wished to spur an "open and realistic assessment" of Bill Vander Zalm's continued leadership. Bruce was said to have grown discontent after the shocking by-election defeat in Cariboo, a longtime stronghold for the party, two weeks prior. Bruce returned the Socred caucus on February 14, 1990, alongside Mercier and Mowat (Crandall had already rejoined caucus in January).

In 2009, Conflict of Interest Commissioner Paul Fraser ruled that Bruce received no direct benefit of his former cabinet post, despite acting as a paid consultant to the Cowichan Journey of a Generation Society and Cowichan Tribes within two years of losing in the 2005 election. Bruce was, however, found in contravention of the Federal Lobbyists' Code of Conduct for not registering.

References

External links
Graham Bruce

1952 births
British Columbia Liberal Party MLAs
British Columbia Social Credit Party MLAs
Living people
Members of the Executive Council of British Columbia
People from Duncan, British Columbia
21st-century Canadian politicians